The 1964 Soviet Class A Second Group was the second season of the Soviet Class A Second Group football competitions that was established in 1963. It was also the 24th season of the Soviet second tier league competition.

First stage

First subgroup

Second subgroup

Final stage

For places 1-14

For places 15-27

Top scorers
20 goals
 Vasyl Moskalenko (Chernomorets Odessa)
 Romualdas Juška (Žalgiris Vilnius)

17 goals
 Mykola Korolyov (Metallist Kharkov)

16 goals
 Gennadi Krasnitsky (Pakhtakor Tashkent)
 Anatoli Koldakov (Chernomorets Odessa)

Number of teams by republics

See also
 Soviet First League

External links
 1964 season. RSSSF

1964
2
Soviet
Soviet